Tampa Bay Hellenic are an American women's soccer team based in Tampa, Florida. Established in 2008, they currently play in the Women's Premier Soccer League (WPSL). They play their home games at the Ed Radice Sports Complex. Their colors are white, red and black.

History
The team was founded in 2008, and initially played in Atlantic Division of the United Soccer Leagues W-League at the second tier of women's soccer in the United States and Canada. They played in the W-League for three seasons, from 2008 to 2010, and moved to the Women's Premier Soccer League (WPSL) the following season. After the 2012 season, Hellenic merged with another local women's team, VSI Tampa Bay FC, of the W-League. When the VSI organization folded at the end of 2013, Tampa Bay Hellenic returned to the WPSL. In 2014, the club won the WPSL's Sunshine Division title for the third time.

Year-by-year

References

External links
Tampa Bay Hellenic
Hellenic USL Soccer

Women's soccer clubs in the United States
Defunct soccer clubs in Florida
H
Women's Premier Soccer League teams
USL W-League (1995–2015) teams
2008 establishments in Florida
Association football clubs established in 2008
Women's sports in Florida